The following is a list of notable people associated with West Texas A&M University, located in the American city of Canyon, Texas.

Notable alumni

Politics and government

 Ulane Bonnel, naval historian
 Phil Cates, former state representative
 Larry Combest, former U.S. representative
 Jesse Cross, US Army general
 Angie Debo, historian (faculty member, 1924–1933)
 J. Evetts Haley, historian and political activist
 Grady Hazlewood, state senator (1941–1971), benefactor of Panhandle-Plains Historical Museum, regent of WTAMU
 Anita Thigpen Perry, First Lady of Texas
 Bill Sarpalius, politician
 John T. Smithee, Texas state representative since 1985

Media and arts

 Jennifer Archer, author
 Candace Camp, author
 René Clausen, composer and choral director (faculty member)
 Georgia O'Keeffe, artist (faculty member)
 The Otwell Twins, musicians and businessmen from Tulia and Amarillo
 Bruce Robison, hit country songwriter ("Travelin' Soldier", "Angry All The Time", "Desperately") and singer
 Red Steagall, country singer and Western poet
 French Stewart, actor

Business
 William R. Klesse, CEO and President of Valero Energy Corporation
 Donald E. Powell, former Chairman of the FDIC; current Federal Coordinator of Gulf Coast Rebuilding

Education
 John S. Goff, government and history professor
 Helen Neal, in 1962 became the first black graduate
 Jean A. Stuntz, history professor
Shanna Peeples, education professor

Athletes and coaches

 Joe Fortenberry, Olympic Basketball Player
 Anthony Armstrong, NFL  player
 Sergio Castillo, NFL player
 Davy Arnaud, soccer player
 John Ayers, NFL player
 Dalton Bell, NFL  player
 Tully Blanchard, professional wrestler
 Bryan Braman, NFL  player
 Bruiser Brody (Frank Goodish), professional wrestler
 Ray Brown, NFL  player
 Maurice Cheeks, Hall of Fame NBA player and coach
 Ted DiBiase, professional wrestler (did not graduate)
 Carolyn Dorin-Ballard, professional ten-pin bowler who won 20 titles on the PWBA tour and 2 more in the PBA Women's Series
 Manny Fernandez, professional wrestler
 Dory Funk Jr., professional wrestler
 Terry Funk, professional wrestler
 Stan Hansen, professional wrestler
Heath Herring (attended), football player and wrestler; retired mixed martial artist fighter, formerly for the Ultimate Fighting Championship
 Alondra Johnson, Canadian Football League player
 Steve Kragthorpe, college football head coach
 Kareem Larrimore, NFL player
 Ryan Leaf, NFL  player and quarterbacks coach (faculty member)
 Jerry Logan, NFL  player
 Charly Martin, NFL player
 Mickey Matthews, college football head coach
 Reggie McElroy, NFL  player
 Mercury Morris, NFL  player
 Dick Murdoch, professional wrestler
 Keith Null, NFL player
 Dusty Rhodes, professional wrestler
 Khiry Robinson, NFL  player
 Tito Santana (Merced Solis), professional wrestler
 Mike Scroggins, professional ten-pin bowler who has won 8 titles (including 2 majors) on the PBA Tour
 Marsha Sharp, head coach of the Texas Tech Lady Raiders basketball team
 Eugene Sims, NFL  player
 Jerry Simmons, tennis coach  
 Duane Thomas, NFL player
 Chaun Thompson, NFL player
 Dustin Vaughan, NFL player
 J'Marcus Webb, NFL  player
 Barry Windham, professional wrestler (did not graduate)
 Bobby Duncum Sr., professional wrestler
 Rellie Kaputin, Olympic track and field athlete

See also
 List of people from Texas
 West Texas A&M University

References

West Texas AandM University alumni